Libya is a transit and destination country for men and women from sub-Saharan Africa and Asia trafficked for the purposes of forced labor and commercial sexual exploitation. While most foreigners in Libya are economic migrants, in some cases large smuggling debts of $500–$2,000 and illegal status leave them vulnerable to various forms of coercion, resulting in cases of forced prostitution and forced labor. As in previous years, there were isolated reports that women from sub-Saharan Africa were trafficked to Libya for the purposes of commercial sexual exploitation. Although precise figures are unavailable, foreign observers estimate that approximately one to two percent of Libya's 1.5 to 2 million foreigners may be victims of trafficking.

The Government of Libya does not fully comply with the minimum standards for the elimination of trafficking, but is making significant efforts to do so. Libya is placed on Tier 2 Watch List for its failure to provide evidence of increasing efforts to address trafficking in persons over the previous year, particularly in the area of investigating and prosecuting trafficking offenses. During the year, Libya provided in-kind assistance to training programs designed to educate law enforcement and civil society groups about trafficking. The government also appointed a national anti-trafficking coordinator responsible for Libya's efforts to protect trafficking victims and punish trafficking offenders. As in previous years, however, Libya did not publicly release any data on investigations or punishment of any trafficking offenses.

In recent years more governments as well as the UN began acknowledging the continuous violations of human rights as well as the chronic failures by the Libyan authorities to address the issue.

Proofs
In 2016, the photojournalist Narciso Contreras, with the help of the Carmignac Photojournalism Award, brought back pictures of migrants in detention centres in Libya. The same year, journalists Meron Estefanos and Mirjam Van Reisen conducted interviews with Eritrean refugees who were smuggled to Libya through Sudan. The interviews revealed that many traffickers abduct and torture some refugees. Furthermore, they revealed that Libyan ISIS cells also participated in smuggling as well as abduction of refugees. Scholars have shown that contemporary trafficking from sub-Saharan Africa to Libya could lead to different forms of captivity, such as debt bondage, forced prison labor, and hostage taking for ransom. Such forms of exploitation have a long history in the region but are today linked with repressive migration policies and state and non-state systems of political control.

Prosecution
The Government of Libya provided no public information on its law enforcement efforts to punish trafficking in persons during the reporting period. Libya's laws do not prohibit trafficking for commercial sexual exploitation or forced labor. The government failed to provide data on any criminal investigations, prosecutions, convictions or sentences for trafficking offenses this year, although senior officials noted during the year that Libya prosecuted individuals for confiscating foreign workers' passports until the workers had repaid an alleged and sizeable smuggling 'debt.' Widespread corruption in the country may facilitate trafficking, but the government did not report prosecuting, convicting, or sentencing any official for complicity. In addition, Libya provided in-kind assistance for IOM training of law enforcement officials, including border security and customs, on trafficking.

Protection
Libya took minimal steps to improve protection of victims of trafficking this year. The government did not provide protection services such as psychological or legal assistance to victims of trafficking. Libya provided in-kind support to a program that trained over 80 law enforcement officers and civil society activists to medically assist trafficking victims. Recognizing that many government officials still fail to distinguish between trafficking victims in need of protective services and other migrants, the government permitted international organizations access to vulnerable Eritreans, Ethiopians, Somalis, Sudanese, and Iraqis to screen for evidence of trafficking. While trafficking victims remained susceptible to punishment for unlawful acts, such as immigration violations and prostitution, committed as a result of being trafficked, during the reporting period, there were no reports that trafficking victims were deported. The government does not actively encourage victims to participate in investigations and prosecutions against their traffickers.

Prevention
During the reporting period, Libya took no discernible action to prevent trafficking in persons. The government did not conduct any public awareness campaigns to highlight the issue of trafficking in persons. Libya also did not take any measures to reduce the demand for commercial sex acts. Similarly, Libya did not undertake any public awareness campaigns targeting citizens traveling to known child sex tourism destinations abroad.

References

Libya
Libya
Human rights abuses in Libya
Crime in Libya by type
Slavery in Libya
Women's rights in Libya